Joys of Life is a Singaporean Chinese drama which was telecasted on Singapore's free-to-air channel, MediaCorp Channel 8. It stars Chew Chor Meng, Alien Huang, Rui En, Chen Liping, Zheng Geping, Chloe Wang, Kate Pang, Andie Chen, Huang Wenyong, Lin Meijiao and Zhang Yao Dong as the casts of the series. The series was repeated at 2am on Sundays and at 12am on Tue - Sat in Oct 2020 - Nov 2020.

The series was produced to celebrate 30 years of Chinese language drama being broadcast in Singapore. Set in post-World War II Singapore, the story line spans the decade between the end of the Japanese occupation and the HDB's clearing of squatters during the late 1950s to early 1960s. It is the first on-screen pairing of Rui En and Alien Huang, and Huang's first Singaporean drama.

Story
In an old tenement house at Huaxiang Street, several families live together and play out the acts in life every day. The story revolves around six friends – Zhao Mingxing (Alien Huang), Qian Yiduo (Zhang Yaodong), Han Yongyong (Rui En) and her sister Rourou (Chloe Wang) and Sun Zibin (Andie Chen) and his sister Lianjing (Kate Pang) – and their families as they go about their lives in post-World War II Singapore.

True to his name, Zhao Mingxing "Star", dreams of becoming a star. He is raised by his father, a movie billboard artist. Zhao Dagou (Chew Chor Meng), who has lived through the horrors of the Japanese Occupation, is a master storyteller. Dagou often chides Mingxing for being childish. Zibin, who works in the office of the TV station, has a leftist younger sister, Sun Lianjing. His mother Cai Shuxian (Pan Lingling) married Uncle Roti (San Yow), a bread seller, through an arranged marriage. Shuxian often gripes that she is a victim of a feudal marriage. Han Yongyong is the adopted daughter of Han Jianren (Huang Wenyong), a cook whose love for women and booze forces his wife Liu Daiyu (Lin Meijiao) to be the breadwinner of the family. The couple had wanted to adopt a boy after Daiyu failed to conceive, but the child was swapped. Yongyong grew up being raised as a boy. Thereafter, they gave birth to three daughters. One of them, Han Rourou, is the beauty of Huaxiang Street. She is every man's dream girl, but her heart is set on marrying a foreigner.

The tenement house is owned by bakery owner Qian Caifa (Zheng Geping) and his stingy wife Jin Yinjiao (Chen Liping). The couple has three sons. Qian Yiduo often leaves any dirty job to his indignant younger brother Qian Erduo (Romeo Tan)while he goes off to gallivant, but is still allowed to take over the bakery. This sparks resentment in Erduo. This family occupies the big unit above the bakery. The other occupants are Caifa's cousin Qian Caiguang (Chen Guohua), the latter's wife, Wang Limei (Lin Liyun), who works in a charcoal shop, and their daughter Qian Meihua (Adeline Lim). The mean Caifa took them in only because he feels guilty of having schemed against his cousin to possess the bakery. Although Caifa is prosperous, his marriage is not entirely blissful for he has never gotten over the fact that Cousin Caiguang once embraced Yinjiao. Instead, he is a secret admirer of Shuxian who has more class.

Mingxing loses heart after several unsuccessful attempts to be a star search finalist. He decides to study acting in Japan. While openly opposing it, Dagou nevertheless secretly tries to raise money for his son's overseas education. Moved by this, the filial Mingxing eventually gives up the opportunity to study abroad. When Mingxing finds out that Lianjing is a closet fan of stars, the quarrelsome pair who shares a common interest start dating each other in secret. Dagou saves Zhang Xiaoyu (Apple Hong) who suffers from amnesia. While Mingxing is eager to pair his father with Xiaoyu, Dagou is against the idea.

Yiduo is unaware that Erduo is scheming against him in attempt to take over the bakery. He meets with danger on several occasions, only to be saved by Yongyong who seems to be able to connect in mind with him. Yiduo grows fond of her. Yongyong takes up employment as a domestic help in a Caucasian family. A keen learner, she seizes the chance to learn English, and catches the fancy of Master Johnson (Bobby Tonelli). Rourou breaks up with Yiduo, saying that he is too dependent on his mother.

Rourou signs a contract with a record company. Peterson (George Young), the boss of the company, goes out with Rourou to celebrate. They both get drunk and Peterson takes advantage of Rourou. Peterson, who grew to love Rourou, proposes to Rourou and confesses his love for her. Rourou refuses at first, but ultimately agrees. However, Peterson's family reject Rourou as a daughter-in-law and the pregnant Rourou is abandoned. Daiyu pretends to be the one pregnant so as to protect Rourou from shame, but the latter gives birth to a baby of mixed race. Thereafter, rumours spread, with everyone gossiping behind Rourou's back. Only Zibin stands steadfast beside her.

The getai business is at its peak. The three buddies start Xin Hua Xiang Stage Company. Recognising Dagou's talent as a standup comic, Xiaoyu encourages him to perform at getai shows. Just as Daogou's feelings for Xiaoyu grows, a Japanese by the name of Yamaguchi (Rayson Tan) appears claiming to be Xiaoyu's husband. Dagou is jolted to his senses. Mistaking Xiaoyu for a Japanese, he starts to distance himself from her, however, he feels anguish seeing how she is mistreated by Yamaguchi. The intense competition in the getai business compels Xin Hua Xiang to consider joining the bandwagon in offering striptease acts, to Zibin and Lianjing's objections. Song and dance versus striptease act, the former emerges as the loser.

Mingxing and Lianjing breaks off due to irreconcilable differences.  Their business suffers when the famous comedians Fatty and Skinny leave. Dagou and the witty Uncle Roti salvage the situation by taking centrestage. Surprisingly, they are a hit with the crowd, thus saving Xin Hua Xiang. Uncle Roti stands tall in front of his wife who has always despised him.

1963 sees the advent of the television. Rourou starts life afresh and drags Yongyong to participate in Talentime on TV. Mingxing invites them to perform at his getai, and they become the singing sensation of love ballads. Yiduo falls for Yongyong, but just as he is about to woo her, he discovers to his horror that Yongyong is his twin elder sister. It turns out that Yinjiao had a difficult labour and was unaware that she had given birth to twins. Yongyong was sold away at birth. When Jianren finds out that Caifa is Yongyong's biological father, he creates a ruckus by demanding his money back. Yongyong remains filial to her adoptive parents. On finding out that Caifa has given her up for Shuxian, the jealous Yinjiao flies into a rage and wants to drive her family out.

Set up by Erduo, Yiduo and Lianjing end up in bed together in a drunken stupor. The odd couple are forced to tie the knot. Xiaoyu regains her memory out of a sudden. The truth is revealed that Yamaguchi is the culprit behind her unfortunate state. After Yamaguchi is driven away, Dagou picks up courage to express his love to Xiaoyu. However, he is stunned when Xiaoyu reveals that she is a majie who has vowed celibacy. Meanwhile, Mingxing and Yongyong begin to appreciate each other's virtues, and their feelings for each other grows.

Unhappy that Yongyong is more popular than her, Rourou quits as a singing duo to go solo but fails to earn an audience. For the sake of money, Rourou resorts to performing striptease but is driven to perform in Kuala Lumpur following a police raid. Zibin stays faithfully by her side. When Rourou retires from singing and plumps herself in the bakery, Erduo sets fire to the shop out of resentment.
News that the bakery had been razed reached Caifa and Yinjiao, and through their shop neighbour, they find out that Erduo was seen inside the bakery at that time.

Love abounds when these men and women cross paths. Will lovebirds Mingxing and Yongyong end up as a blissful couple? Will Rourou's heart be melted by Zibin's accommodating nature and sincere love? Will the antagonistic pair Yiduo and Lianjing be together till their twilight years? As for Dagou and Xiaoyu, will there be a surprise ending for them?

Cast

Main cast

Zhao family

Han family

Qian family

Sun family

Supporting cast

Special appearance

30th drama anniversary highlights
Joys of Life was filmed in conjunction with MediaCorp's 30th anniversary of local drama. It is a star-studded mid-year blockbuster drama which continues the legacy of famous getai works "Wok of Life" (福满人间) and "Springs of Life" (春到人间). Set in the '60s to '70s when mobile getai was all the rage, the story will allude to well-known entertainers of the day such as Sakura Teng and the comedy icons Wang Sha and Ye Feng.

Chew Chor Meng makes a comeback after a brief absence due to illness alongside fellow veterans Chen Liping, Zheng Geping, Huang Wenyong, Lin Meijiao, Pan Lingling and Rayson Tan. The cast also includes younger local household names Rui En, Zhang Yao Dong, Andie Chen and Romeo Tan and Taiwanese idols Cynthia Wang and Alien Huang (Xiao Gui). Former artistes such as Cai Ping Kai, Chen Zhonghua, Lina Ng, Tracer Wong, Jacelyn Tay, Moses Lim and Darren Lim made special appearances.

Production
This drama is the first drama in almost 10 years to be filmed at the previously closed Tuas TV World. It was used by the SBC and TCS and is now a training ground for police specialist training. Scenes of the main street and town were filmed there while the rest were filmed at the studios, on the compound of MediaCorp's Caldecott Hill headquarters and nature areas. Another drama was initially planned but was scrapped and "merged" with Joys of Life instead. Filming began on 6 February 2012 and ended on 16 May 2012, and trailers started airing from 29 May 2012. It was directed by 4 directors in different episodes.

This was the third "人间" (period drama-comedy) produced by MediaCorp after Wok of Life (福满人间) and Springs of Life (春到人间). Only Chew Chor Meng has starred in all three.

Reception
Joys of Life was the highest-rated drama of the year in terms of viewership ratings with some 993,000 viewers for its finale, until Don't Stop Believin' overtook the record by breaking the 1 million mark for its finale in September 2012.

See also
 List of MediaCorp Channel 8 Chinese Drama Series (2010s)
 Joys of Life episodes

Notes
 This drama is one of two produced in conjunction with MediaCorp's celebration of 30 years of local Chinese drama and is Channel 8's 49th anniversary drama.
 Six songs were used for singing for the getai (歌台) scene, which was sung by Rui En, Chloe Wang, Candyce Toh and Xiao Gui. The Songs are "给我一个吻","说不出的快活","如果没有你","牵挂","蝴蝶花" and "新桃花江".
 In conjunction to the show, a closed-door "Cha-Chum Bom" dance party event was held on 15 June 2012. This event is organized by Mediacorp Entertains and Channel 8. A roadshow was held at Eastpoint Mall on 16 June 2012.
 Lina Ng's role Little Trumpet appeared in episodes 3 and 6. The role was coincidentally played by her too in the sitcom Right Frequency.
 Episodes 17 and 32 of this drama does not have commentaries for News Tonight during credits reel. 
 After the end of each episode, bloopers will be shown during the credits reel, without audio, after the details of the song titles. Due to overruns in these bloopers, they will be shown immediately after the last few episodes.
 Local colloquialisms and abbreviations are used frequently in dialogues for period authenticity. The main characters are often referred to by their nicknames (e.g. Mingxing is usually called "Gou Zai", which means "Dagou's son", by the adults and Han Jianren, Yongyong's father, is almost always called "Chou Pi", which means "Smelly Fart"). Hokkien abbreviations and terms are often used, for example, "ah chek" is Uncle and Caifa and Yinjiao are often called "Towkay" and "Towkay Neo" which means "boss" and "lady boss" respectively.
 In Episodes 23 and 24, Yinjiao (Chen Liping) suffers a concussion and thinks she is Wang Baochuan (王宝钏), a dan character in Chinese opera. Wang Baochuan and her lover Xue Pinggui are the subject of the romance folktale Wujiapo (武家坡).
 The drama features Taiwanese singers Alien Huang (Xiao Gui) and Chloe Wang in their first and second Singaporean drama respectively.

Overseas broadcast
This drama was one of the first dramas to be broadcast exclusively in Malaysia after its first telecast of two weeks.

Accolades
Joys of Life won three out of thirteen nominations in the Star Awards, including Best Theme Song. It also won a "Highly Commended" award for the Asian Television Awards, which Kate Pang won for Best Actress in a Supporting Role. The other Drams that were nominated Best Theme Song are Don't Stop Believin', It Takes Two, Yours Fatefully and Show Hand

References

Singapore Chinese dramas
2012 Singaporean television series debuts
Channel 8 (Singapore) original programming